The 20th Dáil was elected at the 1973 general election on 28 February 1973 and met on 14 March 1973. The members of Dáil Éireann, the house of representatives of the Oireachtas (legislature) of Ireland, are known as TDs. On 25 May 1977, President Patrick Hillery dissolved the Dáil on the request of Taoiseach Liam Cosgrave. The 20th Dáil lasted  days.

Composition of the 20th Dáil 

Fine Gael and the Labour Party, denoted with bullets, formed the 14th Government of Ireland, known as the National Coalition, with Liam Cosgrave as Taoiseach and Brendan Corish as Tánaiste.

Graphical representation 
This is a graphical comparison of party strengths in the 20th Dáil from March 1973. This was not the official seating plan.

Ceann Comhairle
On the meeting of the Dáil, Seán Treacy (Lab) was proposed by Liam Cosgrave (FG) and seconded by Brendan Corish (Lab) for the position. His election was approved without a vote.

TDs by constituency 
The list of the 144 TDs elected is given in alphabetical order by Dáil constituency.

Changes

See also
Members of the 13th Seanad

References

External links
Houses of the Oireachtas: Debates: 20th Dáil

 
20
20th Dáil